American Home Shield Corporation is an American home warranty company based in Memphis, Tennessee. It administers home warranty contracts on major home systems and appliances.

Overview 

American Home Shield was founded in 1971 and operated independently until it was acquired by ServiceMaster in 1989. In 2018, the American Home Shield business was spun off under Frontdoor, Inc., a new, publicly traded company on the NASDAQ (ticker symbol FTDR). American Home Shield serves over 2 million customers across 49 states and the District of Columbia. It is one of the largest home warranty providers in the United States.  In 2022 alone, the company has received over 10,000 complaints for poor or no service through the BBB; over 24,000 all together. The company works with over 16,000 independent contractor firms and 60,000 technicians in the U.S.  The headquarters are in Memphis, Tennessee.

History 
In 2019, Frontdoor, Inc. acquired Streem, Inc., which uses enhanced augmented reality, computer vision, and machine learning to help home services professionals diagnose home breakdowns virtually and assess if any parts are needed prior to the initial in-home visit.  American Home Shield now uses Streem technology as part of their service process in available markets. Frontdoor launched American Home Shield ProConnect in 2020 to offer on-demand home maintenance services. American Home Shield ProConnect is available in 37 markets.

Headquarters 
The company’s corporate headquarters is located in the heart of downtown Memphis, Tennessee. In March 2020, American Home Shield transitioned all employees to a virtual work environment due to the COVID-19 pandemic. In mid-2021, the company announced that it would be virtual-first company. They outsource all of their customer service to other countries.

Products 
In 2021, American Home Shield launched three new home warranty plan products. 

Product names include (ranging from least to most expensive):

 ShieldSilver - covers the major parts of 14 home systems. 
 ShieldGold - covers the major parts of 14 home systems plus 9 kitchen and laundry appliances.
 ShieldPlatinum - covers the major parts of 14 home systems, 9 kitchen and laundry appliances, and premium features such as roof leak repair coverage, unlimited HVAC refrigerant, one pre-season HVAC tune-up per year, and coverage for Modifications, Code Requirements, and Permits.

In 2022, American Home Shield launched three new home warranty plan products for people either buying or selling a home as part of the real estate transaction.

References

External links 

 

American companies established in 1971
Financial services companies established in 1971
Companies based in Memphis, Tennessee
1971 establishments in Tennessee